Love Is 4 Suckaz/I'm a Sucka 4 Love is the first official mixtape from Zimbabwean singer/songwriter Andra. It is produced by  Kerry Brothers, Jr. (Alicia Keys' songwriting and production partner), Zeke MacUmber, and Andra herself.  It was released in July, 2010.

Track listing

References 

2010 mixtape albums
Alexandra Govere albums